Raleigh County Memorial Airport  is three miles east of Beckley, in Raleigh County, West Virginia, United States. It is owned by the Raleigh County Airport Authority. The airport is used for general aviation and sees one scheduled passenger airline, subsidized by the Essential Air Service program.

Federal Aviation Administration records say the airport had 3,630 passenger boardings (enplanements) in calendar year 2008, 2,626 in 2009 and 2,429 in 2010. The National Plan of Integrated Airport Systems for 2011–2015 categorized it as a non-primary commercial service airport based on  enplanements in 2008 (between 2,500 and 10,000) but would categorize it as general aviation based in enplanements in 2010 (under 2,500).

The airport opened in 1950–52 with a 4200-foot east–west runway; the first airline flights were Piedmont DC-3s in 1952. (The last Piedmont YS-11 left in 1981.) The runway was extended to 5000 ft in the 1950s, and 6750-ft runway 1 was added between 1975 and 1979.

In 2005 the airport was the least busy airport with scheduled airline service in the United States, with 2,578 passengers that year.

Facilities
The airport covers 1,433 acres (580 ha) at an elevation of 2,504 feet (763 m). It has two asphalt runways: 1/19 is 6,750 by 150 feet (2,057 x 46 m) and 10/28 is 5,001 by 100 feet (1,524 x 30 m).

In the year ending July 31, 2011 the airport had 21,904 aircraft operations, average 60 per day: 89% general aviation, 7% air taxi, and 4% military. 59 aircraft were then based at the airport: 52.5% single-engine, 30.5% multi-engine, 7% jet, and 10% helicopter.

Airline and destinations 

Scheduled passenger service:

FedEx Feeder is operated at the field by Mountain Air Cargo.
UPS Airlines is operated by Air Cargo Carriers.

Statistics

References

Other sources 

 Essential Air Service documents (Docket DOT-OST-1997-2761) from the U.S. Department of Transportation:
 Order 2004-6-14 (June 18, 2004): selecting Colgan Air, Inc., d/b/a US Airways Express, to continue providing essential air service at Beckley and Bluefield/Princeton, West Virginia, for the two-year period beginning August 1, 2004, at an annual subsidy of $2,017,064.
 Order 2006-7-2 (July 3, 2006): selecting Colgan Air, Inc., d/b/a US Airways Express, to provide essential air service at Beckley, West Virginia, for a new two-year period beginning August 1, 2006, at a subsidy of $1,930,759 annually.
 Order 2008-6-14 (June 10, 2008): re-selecting Pinnacle Airlines, Corp. d/b/a Colgan Air, Inc., to continue to provide subsidized essential air service (EAS) at Beckley, West Virginia, for the two-year period beginning August 1, 2008, at the annual subsidy rate of $2,092,844.
 Order 2010-6-25 (June 29, 2010): re-selecting Colgan Air, Inc. to provide essential air service (EAS) at Clarksburg/Fairmont and Morgantown, WV, for a combined annual subsidy of $2,976,438, and at Beckley, WV, for an annual subsidy of $2,313, 457, for the two-year period from August 1, 2010, through July 31, 2012. Also selecting Gulfstream International Airlines, Inc., to provide EAS at Parkersburg, WV/Marietta, OH, at an annual subsidy rate of $2,642,237, for a two-year period beginning when the carrier inaugurates full EAS through the end of the 24th month thereafter. The total annual subsidy for all four communities is $7,923,132.
 Order 2012-4-32 (April 30, 2012): selecting Silver Airways to provide Essential Air Service (EAS) at Beckley, Clarksburg/Fairmont ("Clarksburg") and Morgantown, West Virginia, for a combined annual subsidy of $5,968,744 ($2,512,494 for Beckley; $3,456,250 for Clarksburg and Morgantown), for the two-year period beginning when the carrier begins full EAS at all three communities.

External links 
 
 Aerial image as of April 1996 from USGS The National Map
 

Airports in West Virginia
Essential Air Service
Buildings and structures in Raleigh County, West Virginia
Transportation in Raleigh County, West Virginia
Beckley, West Virginia